Simon Gade (born 3 January 1997) is a Danish handball player who plays for Aalborg Håndbold and the Danish national team. He has played several matches for the Danish national junior and youth teams.

In November 2019, he signed a contract with the Danish League club Aalborg Håndbold.

References

1997 births
Living people
Danish male handball players
People from Holstebro
Sportspeople from the Central Denmark Region